Arroz con maíz is a Latin American dish with rice and corn cooked in one pot.

Cuban version 
In Cuba the rice is colored yellow with powdered bijol which is annatto seeds. The rice and corn are cooked in Cuban-style sofrito, chorizo, white wine, Cuban orégano, cumin, and chicken stock.

Dominican version 
Arroz con maíz is a staple in Dominican homes. Very simply done with powdered annatto, chicken bouillon cube and Dominican sofrito called sazón.

Puerto Rican version 
The Puerto Rican version is perhaps the most notable and flavorful in Latin America. The rice is cooked with sofrito as a base. The rice is also dyed yellow from the annatto oil (olive oil that has been infused with annatto seeds). Once the oil is hot salchichas are usually added. Sofrito is then cooked until most of the water has been evaporated. Olives, capers, corn, and bay leaves are then added and cooked for an additional minute. Rice, black pepper, coriander seeds,  cumin, and possibly orégano brujo are then added and stirred until every grain of rice is coated with sofrito. Broth is then poured into the pot and left to cook. This dish popular on Thanksgiving.

External links
Cuban Arroz con maíz
Dominican Moro de maíz
Puerto Rican Arroz con maíz

Cuban cuisine
Dominican Republic cuisine
Puerto Rican cuisine
Caribbean cuisine
Latin American rice dishes
Maize dishes